The 1994 Nebraska Cornhuskers football team represented the University of Nebraska–Lincoln and was the national champion of the 1994 NCAA Division I-A football season. The team was coached by Tom Osborne and played their home games in Memorial Stadium in Lincoln, Nebraska.  The Cornhuskers offense scored 459 points while the defense allowed 162 points.

Before the season
There was much anticipation for the 1994 season.  The 1993 Nebraska team compiled an 11–0 record in the regular season before narrowly losing to Florida State in the 1994 Orange Bowl on a last-second missed field goal.  The 1994 offseason was dubbed "Unfinished Business" by the Huskers, in their quest to secure a national championship for the coming season.

Junior Tommie Frazier returned as the quarterback in Tom Osborne's vaunted triple option offense.  Also returning were several key starters on defense that would prove to be a highly rated unit during the 1994 season.

Schedule

Roster and coaching staff

Depth chart

Game summaries

West Virginia

The 1994 season started for the No. 4 Cornhuskers with a 31–0 win over No. 24 West Virginia in the Kickoff Classic. The game pitted two teams that had posted undefeated regular-season records in 1993. Quarterback Tommie Frazier was the game's MVP, rushing for 130 yards on 12 carries, including touchdown runs of 25, 27, and 42 yards. He also completed 8 of 16 passes for 100 yards and another touchdown. I-back Lawrence Phillips also ran 126 yards on 24 carries. In all, Nebraska gained 368 rushing yards and 468 total. The Nebraska defense dominated the Mountaineers, registering eight quarterback sacks and holding West Virginia to 8 yards rushing and 89 total yards. Todd Sauerbrun set a record for West Virginia with a 90-yard punt and averaged 60.1 yards on nine punts. The victory marked Nebraska's first shutout victory in two years. It was also Nebraska's first shutout victory against a ranked non-conference opponent since a 20–0 win over No. 19 Baylor in Lincoln 1939, and the first ever such win in a game played outside of Lincoln. The win vaulted Nebraska to No. 1 in the polls.

Texas Tech

Next up was a road victory that saw the Huskers cruise past the Texas Tech Red Raiders, 42–16, which remarkably saw the Huskers drop to #2 in the polls.  Unfortunately, this victory came at a cost, as safety Mike Minter suffered a season-ending knee injury.

UCLA

Pacific

The next two weeks first saw a tough match-up, where the Huskers would dominate #13-ranked UCLA in Memorial Stadium, followed by a blowout against Pacific.  Shortly after this victory, the 1994 season got a lot more interesting when Nebraska's field general Tommie Frazier was sidelined by a blood clot in his right knee.

Wyoming

Oklahoma State

Kansas State

With Frazier sidelined, junior Brook Berringer answered the call to run Osborne's offense.  Berringer, a pro-style QB from Goodland, Kansas, came off the bench and performed at his best in two straight victories against Wyoming and Oklahoma State, even at times with a partially collapsed lung.  When it became too much for Berringer, walk-on QB Matt Turman stepped up to lead the Cornhuskers against Okie State and in a tough road game that pitched the Huskers against conference foe and neighbor Kansas State. This game proved to be a defensive battle, which saw the Huskers walk away with a 17–6 victory against the #16 Wildcats.

Missouri

Colorado

Nebraska's homecoming game and 200th consecutive home sell out.

Kansas

Iowa State

Oklahoma

The final five regular season games saw Nebraska beat #2 Colorado, where the defense shut down eventual Heisman winner Rashaan Salaam.  Only Oklahoma provided any resistance for the Huskers, who escaped with a 13–3 victory in Norman, and another Big Eight Conference Championship.

Miami

Nebraska was #1 in the nation, and found themselves pitted against #3 Miami in the Orange Bowl, a setting very familiar to Tom Osborne and his Husker players. Osborne had been in this very stadium on three separate occasions playing for a national championship, and came away empty-handed each time, losing the previous year against Bobby Bowden's Seminoles of Florida State, to the Miami Hurricanes in the legendary 1984 Orange Bowl by the score of 31–30, and to the #1 Clemson Tigers in the 1982 Orange Bowl, a night game in which Nebraska entered #4 where the #2 and #3 teams lost their bowl games earlier in the day.

But it would be much different this year.  Frazier had returned from his injury, and Nebraska would not back down, even after trailing 10–7 at halftime and 17–7 with less than two minutes to go in the third quarter. It is important to note that during his halftime speech, Coach Osborne had predicted the eventual meltdown of Miami late in the game.  He told his players that if they maintained their composure, that Miami would slip up and earn a costly penalty.  Osborne's prediction rang true, and the physically dominant Huskers scored 15 unanswered points in the 4th quarter on two key TD runs by FB Corey Schlesinger to earn Tom Osborne his first national title, by the score of 24–17.

Rankings

After the season
The successful season saw Nebraska lead the nation in rushing, with talented but troubled sophomore Lawrence Phillips rushing for 1,722 yards and finishing 8th in Heisman voting.  The offensive line, which was arguably the best in the country as well, was affectionately known as "The Pipeline" and included Outland Trophy winner and All-American Zach Wiegert at tackle, fellow All-American Brendan Stai at guard, along with Rob Zatechka, Joel Wilks, and Aaron Graham.  The vaunted 4–3 defense, led by All-American linebacker Ed Stewart, limited conference opponents to a mere 55 points.

The Huskers were treated to a warm welcome, despite the freezing temperatures, when they returned to Lincoln as National Champions.  An estimated 15,000 fans were on hand at the Lincoln Airport to welcome home their Big Red heroes.

Awards

NFL and pro players
The following Nebraska players who participated in the 1994 season later moved on to the next level and joined a professional or semi-pro team as draftees or free agents.

Additionally, starting junior punter Darin Erstad also played baseball for the University of Nebraska, and was selected as a First Team All-American by Collegiate Baseball.  He chose to forego his college career to enter the MLB draft and was selected as the first pick overall in the 1995 Major League Baseball draft.  He would go on to have a distinguished career in Major League Baseball (particularly with the Anaheim Angels).  Erstad would later be the head coach of the Nebraska Cornhuskers baseball from 2012 to 2019.

References

Nebraska
Nebraska Cornhuskers football seasons
College football national champions
Big Eight Conference football champion seasons
Orange Bowl champion seasons
College football undefeated seasons
Nebraska Cornhuskers football